Sonesangavi is a village in Beed district, Maharashtra state, India. It is situated 17 km away from sub-district headquarter (Taluka) Kaij and 76 km away from district headquarter (District) Beed. It belongs to Marathwada region and Aurangabad division. Its altitude is 674 meter above sea level. As per 2009 stats, Sonesangavi is the gram panchayat of Sonesangavi village. According to Census 2011 information the location code or village code of Sonesangavi village is 559769. Telephone std code for the village is 02445.

There is no railway station near Sonesangavi in less than 53 km(Dhoki) & 60 km(Parli). Other railway stations near to village are Kalamb Road, Thair, Murud. Sonesangavi is surrounded by Dharur Taluka towards North, Kalamb Taluka towards South, Wadwani Taluka towards North, Ambajogai Taluka towards East. This Place is in the border of the Beed District and Osmanabad District. 
The total population of the village is about 1,384 (2011) among which 738 are males. The number of households in the village is around 327.

History
Sonesangavi was single village situated in the region where now there is now Manjara Dam built. After building Manjara Dam Sonesangavi were divided into two parts- Sonesangavi-1(West) and Sonesangavi-2(East). Now both villages contribute in panchayat elections to select sarpanch and other panchas (members).

Temples

Sonesangavi (1):  Vitthal-Rukmini temple, Hanuman temple, Sant Goroba kaka temple, and Mosque etc.

Sonesangavi (2): Vitthal-Rukmini temple, Hanuman temple, Narsoba temple etc.

Festivals

Gudi Padwa, Chaitragaur, Ram Navami, Narali Pournima, Mangala Gauri, Janmashtami, Ganeshotsav, Navaratri, Kojagiri Pournima, Diwali, Khandoba Festival/Champa Shashthi, Makar Sankranti, Shivaratri, Holi, Eid etc.

Economy
Sonesangavi (1 and 2) villages are near to the Manjara Dam, and the villages economy is completely based on the agriculture. 90% economy of both villages is from field and daily wages in that, Rice, jowar, bajra, wheat, tur, mung, urad, gram, pulses, oilseeds, groundnut, sunflower, soyabean, cotton, sugarcane, turmeric, mango, banana, orange, grapes, cashew nut, etc. are the major crops that are cultivated mostly in the area.

Facilities

Sonesangavi (1)

Education: Sonesangavi village has two Zilla Parishad (local government) high schools. Zpps Surdi and Zpps Sonesangavi. Zpps Sonesangavi is primary school with first class to fourth class. Zpps Surdi is a primary with upper primary School in Surdi Village of Kaij. It was established in 1954 and the school management is a local body. It is a Marathi medium - co-educational school. Zpps Surdi runs in a government school building. The school has eight classrooms. The lowest class is 1 and the highest class in the school is 7. This school has five male teachers and three female teachers. There is a library facility available in this school. This school also has a playground. Zpps Surdi does not provide any residential facility. The school also provides meal facility and meal is prepared in school. 
One private high school (Kranti Surya Madyamik Vidyalaya Sonesangavi-Surdi).
Kranti Surya Mk. Vidyalaya, Sonesangavi-Surdi is affiliated to the Maharashtra State Board for Secondary and Higher Education. Students from this school appear for the SSC (Senior Secondary Certificate) examinations after class 10.

Transport: There are 18-hour auto-rikshaw facilities for the village from Sonesangavi/Surdi to Kalamb (nearest market) for every 30 minutes. The nearest animal market (bullocks, cows, buffalo, goats and chicken) takes place on every Thursday in Salegaon. While vegetable market in Kalamb is popular in village which takes place on every Monday. Other facilities proposed for the village include a primary health care center and a library.

Sonesangavi (2)

Education: Sonesangavi village has one Zilla Parishad (local government) high school. Zpps Sonesangavi is primary school with first class to fourth class. To complete high school education students are supposed to go to Yousuf Wadgaon High School, Yousuf Wadgaon.

Health care: There is no hospital or doctor in Sonesangavi (1 and 2). Patients are supposed to go to Yousuf Wadgaon (government hospital and private hospital) or Kalamb (private hospital).

To file RTI visit.

Sonesangavi cuisine
Anarsa, Basundi, Batata vada, Bhakri, Chikki, Dioscorea alata, Gujia, Jhunka, Kaala masala, Kadboli, Misal Pav, Modak, Narsobawadi Basundi, Patrode, Pav Bhaji, Pithla bhakri, Pudachi Vadi, Poha, Puneri Misal, Puran poli, Ragda pattice, Sabudana Khichadi, Sabudana vada, Shrikhand, Thalipeeth, Thecha, Tilgul, Usual, Vada pav, Varan bhaat, Varanfal are few of the many varieties of Sonesangavi.

Schools near Sonesangavi
Sonesangavi (1)
Kranti Surya Madhyamik Vidyalaya, Sonesangavi.
Zilla Parishad Prathamik school, Sonesangavi.
Vidyabhavan High School, Kalamb (Address: Vidyabhavan High School, Kalamb, Kalamb, Osmanabad, Maharashtra - 413507)
Madhyamik Vid Bankaranja (Address: Bankaranja, Kaij, Beed, Maharashtra. PIN-431123, Post - Kaij)
Vasundhara Hs Ladegaon (Address: Ladegaon, Kaij, Beed, Maharashtra. PIN- 431123, Post - Kaij)
Vasundhara Vid Paithan (s.) (Address: Paithan, Kaij, Beed, Maharashtra. PIN- 431518, Post - Bansorala)
Vasundhara Hs Kanadi Badan (Address: Kanadi badan, Kaij, Beed, Maharashtra. PIN- 431518, Post - Bansorala)

Sonesangavi (2)
Yousuf Wadgaon High School, Yousuf Wadgaon (Address: Yousuf Wadgaon, Kaij, Beed, Maharashtra. PIN- 431517, Post - Yousuf Wadgaon)
Vasundhara Vid Paithan (s.) (Address: Paithan, Kaij, Beed, Maharashtra. PIN- 431518, Post - Bansorala)

Places to visit
 Tuljapur- 86 km
 Ambajogai- 56 km
 Pandharpur- 156 km
 Aurangabad- 171 km
Nanded- 163 km
 Hingoli- 178 km
 Gulbarga- 193 km

Airports
Domestric
Latur Airport - 58 km
Sholapur Airport - 135 km
Nanded Airport - 157 km
Chikkalthana Airport - 164 km
Osmanabad - 56 km
Aurangabad Airport - 200 km

International
Chatrapati Shivaji International Airport, Mumbai - 460 km
Rajiv Gandhi International Airport, Hyderabad - 350 km

Nearby cities
 Kalamb
 Manjlegaon 
 Kaij
 Osmanabad
 Ambajogai
 Latur
 Beed

Nearby villages
 Salegaon
 Malegaon
 Sukli
 Surdi
 Undri
 Kekat Sarni
 Kalamb Amba
 Kekanwadi
 Dhanegaon
 Chausala
 Ram-Wadgaon
 Sukli
 Takli
 Adas
 Borgaon
 Borisawegaon
 Gotegaon
 Chincholi Mali
 Sarni Anandgaon
 Shirpura
 Sonijawala

See also

 Beed
 Maharashtra
 Kalamb, Osmanabad
 Kaij
 Marathwada

References

Villages in Beed district